Jadwiga Łuszczewska (pen name: Deotyma (Diotima); 1 July 1834 – 23 September 1908) was a Polish poet, novelist and salonniére. She was born and died in Warsaw.

Works
 Lech (1859)
 Branki w jasyrze (1889)
 Panienka z okienka (1898)
 Sobieski pod Wiedniem (1908)
 Pamiętnik 1834-1897 (1968)

References
 J. Rokoszny: Wspomnienia o Deotymie [Memories of Deotyma]. Radom 1934

External links
 
 

1834 births
1908 deaths
Polish women novelists
Jauch family
Women writers from the Russian Empire
19th-century Polish novelists
20th-century Polish novelists
19th-century Polish women writers
19th-century Polish writers
20th-century Polish women writers
20th-century Polish writers
Poets from the Russian Empire
Novelists from the Russian Empire
Writers from Warsaw
19th-century Polish poets
Polish salon-holders